The Brulé are one of the seven branches or bands (sometimes called "sub-tribes") of the Teton (Titonwan) Lakota American Indian people. They are known as Sičhą́ǧu Oyáte (in Lakȟóta) —Sicangu Oyate—,  Sicangu Lakota, or "Burnt Thighs Nation". Learning the meaning of their name, the French called them the Brûlé (literally, "burnt"). The name may have derived from an incident where they were fleeing through a grass fire on the plains.

Distribution
Many Sičhą́ǧu people live on the Rosebud Indian Reservation in southwestern South Dakota and are enrolled in the federally recognized Rosebud Sioux Tribe, also known in Lakȟóta as the Sičhą́ǧu Oyáte. A smaller population lives on the Lower Brule Indian Reservation, on the west bank of the Missouri River in central South Dakota, and on the Pine Ridge Indian Reservation, also in South Dakota, directly west of the Rosebud Indian Reservation. The different federally recognized tribes are politically independent of each other.

Name

The term "Sičhą́ǧu" appears on pages 3 to 14 of Beginning Lakhóta.

"Ká  Lakȟóta kį líla hą́ske. 'That Indian (over yonder) is very tall.'"
"Hą, hé Sičhą́ǧú. 'Yes, that's a Rosebud Sioux.'"

It appears to be a compound word of the Thítȟųwą Lakȟóta dialect, meaning "burned thigh".

Historic Brulé Thiyóšpaye or bands 
Together with the Oglála Lakȟóta, who are mostly based at the Pine Ridge Indian Reservation, they are often called Southern Lakȟóta. 

They were divided in three great regional tribal divisions:

 Lower Brulé (Khúl Wičháša Oyáte, ″Lowland People″, lived along the White River to its mouth at the Missouri River (Mnišóše) as well in the Missouri River Valley in South Dakota; some ventured south to the Niobrara River).
 Upper Brulé (Ȟeyáta Wičháša Oyáte - ″Highland People″, ventured further south and west onto the Plains along the Platte River between the North and South Platte River in Nebraska in the search for buffalo. The allied Southern Cheyenne and Southern Arapaho welcomed them as strong allies to this lands which they had further claimed, along the Loup River - the former center of the Skidi or Wolf/Loup Pawnee.  They went south to plunder enemy Pawnee and Arikara camps, and were therefore also known as: Kheyatawhichasha - ″People away from the (Missouri) River″)
 (Upper) Brulé of the Platte River (a splinter group of the Upper Brulé and the southernmost Brulé group, generally along the South Platte River in Colorado, with hunting bands south to the Republican River - home to the enemy Kithehaki / Kitkehaxki of the South Bands Pawnee, also known as: Kheyatawhichasha - ″People away from the (Missouri) River″)

According to the Brulé Medicine Bull (Tatȟą́ka Wakȟą́), the people were decentralized and identified with the following thiyóšpaye, or extended family groups, who collected in various local thiwáhe (English: camps or family circles):

 Apewantanka
 Chokatowela
 Ihanktonwan
 Iyakoza
 Kanghi yuha
 Nakhpakhpa
 Pispiza wichasha
 Shawala
 Shiyolanka
 Wacheunpa
 Waleghaunwohan

Ethnobotany
The Brulé give pulverized roots of Asclepias viridiflora to children with diarrhea.  Nursing mothers take an infusion of the whole plant  to increase their milk. They brew the leaves of Ceanothus herbaceus into a tea.

Notable Sicangu (Brulé)

Bob Barker Game Show Host
 Pappy Boyington, WWII Marine Corps fighter ace and Medal of Honor recipient
 Mary Brave Bird, author
 Leonard Crow Dog, spiritual leader, American Indian Movement activist
 Paul Eagle Star (1866-24 August 1891), performer with Buffalo Bill's Wild West Show
 Hollow Horn Bear, chief
 Iron Nation, chief
 Iron Shell, chief
 Little Thunder, chief 
 Arnold Short Bull, a well-known Sicangu holy man, who brought the Ghost Dance to the Lakota in South Dakota in 1890
 Lone Feather, Republican public administrator from South Dakota, first Lakota elected to the U.S. House of Representatives
 Michael Spears, actor
 Eddie Spears, actor
 Spotted Tail or "Sinte Gleska", 19th-century chief
 Nellie Star Boy Menard, quiltmaker
 Moses Stranger Horse, artist
 Two Strike, chief
 Albert White Hat, Lakota language teacher
 Dyani White Hawk, contemporary painter and former curator of All My Relations Arts gallery
 Rosebud Yellow Robe, folklorist, educator and author
 Frank Waln, rapper

See also
 Bois-Brûlés

References

External links

 Official website of the Sicangu Oyate, Rosebud Sioux Tribe
 Indian genealogy
 Official website of the Kul Wicasa Oyate (Lower Brule)

 
Great Sioux War of 1876